Rafael Navarro may refer to:

 Rafael Navarro (comics) (born 1967), American comics author
 Rafa Navarro (footballer, born 1994), Spanish footballer
 Rafa Navarro (footballer, born 1972), Spanish footballer
 Rafael Navarro (painter) (Rafael Navarro Núñez, 1946–2015), Spanish
 Rafael Navarro (photographer) (Rafael Navarro Garralaga, born 1940), Spanish
 Rafael Navarro-Gonzalez (1959–2021), Mexican chemist
 Rafael Navarro (footballer) (born 2000), Brazilian footballer